Walter Trumbull was a prominent American explorer and writer.  He was a member of the Washburn–Langford–Doane Expedition in 1870 that explored the area of Wyoming that would eventually become Yellowstone National Park.

He was the son of United States Senator Lyman Trumbull.

He contributed to the Helena Rocky Mountain Gazette and the Overland Monthly.

References

External links
Walter Trumbull's Journal of the 1870 Washburn Expedition

1846 births
1891 deaths